Miravé is a locality in the municipality of Pinell de Solsonès, in Province of Lleida province, Catalonia, Spain. As of 2020, it has a population of 21.

Geography 

References

Populated places in the Province of Lleida